Steve Little (born 6 June 1953) is an Australian former professional rugby league footballer who played for the South Sydney Rabbitohs.

Little, a Zetland junior, featured mostly as a fullback and winger for South Sydney.

He made 57 first-grade appearances from 1974 to 1978.

References

External links
Steve Little at Rugby League project

1953 births
Living people
Australian rugby league players
South Sydney Rabbitohs players
Rugby league fullbacks
Rugby league wingers